Tapura is a genus of plant in family Dichapetalaceae.

Species include:

 Tapura africana Oliv.
 Tapura arachnoidea Breteler
 Tapura carinata Breteler
 Tapura ivorensis Breteler
 Tapura letestui Pellegr.
 Tapura magnifolia Prance
 Tapura neglecta N.Hallé & Heine
 Tapura orbicularis Ekman ex Urb.

References

 
Malpighiales genera
Taxonomy articles created by Polbot